Alemayo Kebede (born 10 April 1987) is an Eritrean footballer who plays as an attacking midfielder for Adelaide Blue Eagles in the National Premier Leagues.

Club career
In 2011, he signed with FFSA Super League club Croydon Kings after being granted political asylum by the Australian government. Following the 2012 Super League season it was announced he had won the Sergio Melta Medal which is awarded to the best player in the league.

International career
Kebede played in the 2009 CECAFA Cup in Kenya, appearing in at least one match against Zimbabwe.

Personal life

Whilst competing in the 2009 CECAFA Cup in Kenya he was part of the Eritrea national football team which failed to return home after competing in the regional tournament in Nairobi. After receiving political asylum from the Australian government, the team moved to Adelaide, Australia.

Honors
 2012 Sergio Melta Medal (FFSA Super League Player of the Year)

References

External links
 

1987 births
Living people
Eritrean footballers
Eritrea international footballers
Association football midfielders
Red Sea FC players
Croydon Kings players
Adelaide Raiders SC players
Western Strikers SC players
Adelaide Blue Eagles players
Adelaide Olympic FC players
FFSA Super League players
National Premier Leagues players
Eritrean expatriate footballers
Eritrean expatriate sportspeople in Australia
Expatriate soccer players in Australia
Eritrean refugees
Sportspeople from Asmara
Eritrean Premier League players